"Crazy in Love" is a song by songwriters Even Stevens and Randy McCormick; it was first recorded by Joe Cocker on his 1984 album Civilized Man. The song was covered by American pop artist Kim Carnes in 1988 and released as the second single from her album View from the House. Carnes' version peaked at number 13 on the Billboard Adult Contemporary chart and number 68 on the Billboard Hot Country Singles & Tracks chart.

The song was covered by American country music artist Conway Twitty for his 1990 album Crazy in Love. It was released in August 1990 as the first single from the album. Twitty's version reached number two on the Billboard Hot Country Singles & Tracks chart in November 1990 and number one on the Cashbox country charts, making it the last song of Twitty's to hit number one on a national chart.

Kenny Rogers also covered the song in 1990 for his album Love Is Strange. Released as the album's second single, Rogers' version peaked at number 9 on the Billboard Adult Contemporary chart.

Julio Iglesias covered this song in 1998 on his album My Life: The Greatest Hits.

Chart performance

Kim Carnes

Conway Twitty

Kenny Rogers

References

1984 songs
1988 singles
1990 singles
Joe Cocker songs
Kim Carnes songs
Kenny Rogers songs
Conway Twitty songs
Julio Iglesias songs
MCA Records singles
Reprise Records singles
Songs written by Even Stevens (songwriter)
Songs written by Randy McCormick
Song recordings produced by Jimmy Bowen